A crusher is a machine designed to reduce large solid chunks of raw material into smaller ones.

Crusher or The Crusher may also refer to:

People
 "Crusher", nickname of Noel Cleal (born 1958), Australian former rugby league footballer
 "Crusher Yurkof", early ring name for professional wrestler Bam Bam Bigelow (1961–2007)
 Jerry Blackwell (1949–1995), American professional wrestler known as "Crusher Blackwell"
 Judith Collins (born 1959), New Zealand politician and lawyer known as "Crusher Collins"
 "Krusher Khruschev", early ring name for professional wrestler Barry Darsow (born 1959)
 "Crusher Bloomfield" and "Crusher Gray", early ring names for professional wrestler One Man Gang (born George Gray in 1960)
 The Crusher (wrestler), ring name of Reginald Lisowski, a former professional wrestler
 Steve Casey (1908–1987), Irish rower and professional wrestler known as "Crusher Casey"
 Yusuke Kawaguchi (born 1980), Japanese mixed martial artist and professional wrestler
 Connor Michalek (2005–2014), professional wrestling fan nicknamed "The Crusher"

Fictional characters 
 Absorbing Man (Carl "Crusher" Creel), a Marvel Comics villain
 Crusher, the name of an Earth-element character in Skylanders: Giants
 Beverly Crusher, Jack Crusher, and Wesley Crusher, in the television series Star Trek: The Next Generation and in some cases the related films
 Crusher, a recurring character in TV show The Simpsons
 Crusher (comics), three Marvel Comics villains
 Crusher Joe, science fiction light novels by Haruka Takachiho (also exist as an animated film)
 Crusher, or Moses, in the anime series Beyblade: see BEGA League
 Milburn or "Crusher", in the British sitcom Last of the Summer Wine
 Crusher, a recurring sometimes antagonistic character from Blaze and the Monster Machines

Music 
 The Crusher (album), a 2001 album by melodic death metal band Amon Amarth
 "The Crusher", a song by Dee Dee King
 "The Crusher", a song by The Novas about the wrestler.
 "The Crusher", a song by the Ramones from Adios Amigos

Sports teams

Canada 
 Orangeville Crushers, a former Canadian Junior "A" ice hockey team from Orangeville, Ontario
 Pictou County Crushers, a Canadian junior ice hockey team based in New Glasgow, Nova Scotia
 Shallow Lake Crushers, a senior hockey team based out of Shallow Lake, Ontario

United States 
 Connecticut Crushers, a women's American football team based in Hartford, Connecticut
 Lake Erie Crushers, a Frontier League professional baseball team based in Avon, Ohio
 Sonoma County Crushers, a former minor league baseball team in California

Elsewhere 
 Caithness Crushers, a Scottish rugby league team based in Thurso
 South Queensland Crushers, an Australian rugby league team

Other uses 
 Crusher (robot), a military robot vehicle
 The Crusher (1917 film), an American silent film
 A potato masher, or crusher

See also
 
 
 Crush (disambiguation)
 Crushed (disambiguation)